The historical absence of a continuously operating national league and a multi-division football system has made it difficult to truly determine and recognize the highest level tournament of the Philippines. The Philippine Football Federation, the governing body of football in the Philippines, has held men's national championship tournaments in various forms since 1911. The latest of these national tournaments is the National Men's Club Championship, which was started in 2011. These annual championship tournaments are not regularly recurring professional leagues, but are usually the only notable football competitions occurring in the country for that year. The winners of these tournaments are therefore considered the de facto football champions of the Philippines.

Given the complex history of football in the Philippines, this article takes into account all notable "national" football competitions organized by the Philippine Football Federation. Also included are newer leagues such as the United Football League, the Philippines Football League, and the Philippine Premier League.

Philippine Football Federation competitions

Men's

National championship
Various tournaments and leagues have been directly organized by the Philippine Football Federation, such as the National Men's Open Championship, the Philippine Football League (P-League), the Manila Premier Football League (MPFL), and the Filipino Premier League, among others. These leagues were often short-lived, and thus do not have a champions list readily available. The champions of these tournaments are lumped together in the following tables as "national champions".

Philippine Football League (P-League)

First attempt

Relaunch
Relaunched as the "P-League" in 1998.

Manila Premier Football League

Filipino Premier League

Men's National Club Championship (2011–15)

Philippines Football League (2017–)

Women's

Philippine Ladies' Football National League (1980s)

Women's League (2016–)

United Football League (2009–16)
The United Football League Division 1 was established as a premier league in 2009. The League is a round-robin tournament with a First Division and Second Division. The winners listed below do not include the winners of the UFL Cup, a knockout-tournament which allows teams to participate regardless of their division. In a season, the Cup competition is held first from mid-October to mid-December, followed by the League competition from January to June of the following year.

References

General
 

champions
Philippines